Countrywide Legal Indemnities is a British title insurance company founded in 1994. The company is based in Norwich, Norfolk and, employs around seventy staff.

Countrywide Legal Indemnities is an underwriting agency that works with conveyancing professionals. They act as a middle man for Liberty Mutual, which supplies legal indemnity insurance and protection to individuals and firms purchasing property or land with a title defect.

In 2006, the Solicitors Journal named Countrywide as being "one of the country’s leading intermediaries". In 2007, the Sunday Times listed Countrywide Legal in 34th place in its list of "Best 100 Companies".

In 1997, Countrywide became the first legal indemnity provider to be endorsed by The Law Society, providing its members with a Defective Title insurance Scheme and other related indemnities on their behalf. This endorsement lasted until 2009, and the endorsement has since passed to a competitor, First Title Insurance.

Contaminated land and Japanese knotweed 

Since 2001, local authorities in England have been testing land for harmful chemicals under the new environmental measures that were introduced and this has encouraged firms such as Countrywide to develop policies to protect against the threat of historical contaminated land.

Countrywide Legal Indemnities also launched a Japanese knotweed indemnity policy in 2015 due to changes on the TA6 property form, and the increasing number of properties affected by knotweed. However, these policies will only cover properties that are not affected by knotweed and then only for a few years, raising questions as to how useful the insurance really is.

References

External links
Countrywide Legal Indemnities website

Financial services companies established in 1994
Law of the United Kingdom
Insurance companies of the United Kingdom
Companies based in Norwich